Eastern pasqueflower may refer to:

Pulsatilla nuttalliana, flowering plant native to much of North America
Pulsatilla patens, flowering plant native to Europe, Russia, Mongolia, and China